Hestvika is a village in the municipality of Hitra in Trøndelag county, Norway.

Hestvika has a marina suitable for light watercraft. The fishing village has various industries including fish processing.

References

Hitra
Villages in Trøndelag